A vila is a town in Portugal. It does not necessarily correspond to a municipality. There are 533 towns in Portugal.
Some towns are the seat of municipality ('municipio'); others belong to a municipality.
Alphabetically, the towns are as follows:

Source: Instituto Nacional de Estatística

A
 A dos Cunhados
 A dos Francos
 Abragão
 Abraveses
 Aguada de Cima
 Águas Santas (in Maia Municipality)
 Aguiar da Beira
 Alandroal
 Albergaria-a-Velha
 Alcains
 Alcanena
 Alcanhões
 Alcantarilha, in Silves Municipality
 Alcobertas
 Alcochete
 Alcoutim
 Aldeia do Carvalho
 Alenquer
 Alfândega da Fé
 Alfarelos (Soure Municipality)
 Alfeizerão
 Algés, Oeiras Municipality
 Algoz
 Algueirão-Mem Martins, Sintra Municipality
 Alhadas
 Alhandra
 Alhos Vedros
 Alijó
 Aljezur
 Aljubarrota
 Aljustrel
 Almancil
 Almeida
 Almendra
 Almodôvar
 Almofala, Castro Daire Municipality
 Alpendurada
 Alpiarça
 Alter do Chão
 Alvaiázere
 Alvalade
 Alvite
 Alvito
 Alvor, Portimão
 Amareleja
 Amares
 Amiais de Baixo
 Ançã
 Angeja
 Anha
 Ansião
 Anta
 Apúlia
 Arazede
 Arco de Baúlhe
 Arcos de Valdevez
 Arcozelo
 Arganil
 Argoncilhe
 Argozelo
 Armação de Pêra
 Armamar
 Arouca
 Arraiolos
 Arranhó
 Arrifana
 Arronches
 Arruda dos Vinhos
 Avanca
 Aveiras de Cima
 Avelar
 Avintes
 Avis
 Avô
 Azambuja
 Azeitão
 Azueira

B
 Baião
 Baixa da Banheira
 Barrancos
 Barrosas
 Barroselas
 Batalha
 Belas, Sintra
 Belmonte
 Benavente
 Benedita
 Benfica do Ribatejo
 Beringel
 Bobadela
 Boidobra
 Bombarral
 Borba
 Boticas
 Branca
 Brejos de Azeitão
 Britiande
 Brito
 Bucelas

C
 Cabanas de Tavira
 Cabanas de Viriato
 Cabeceiras de Basto
 Cacia, Aveiro
 Cadaval
 Caldas das Taipas
 Caldas de S Jorge
 Caldelas
 Calheta, Madeira
 Camacha, Madeira
 Camarate
 Cambres
 Caminha
 Campelos
 Campo
 Campo de Besteiros
 Campo Maior
 Canas de Santa Maria
 Canas de Senhorim
 Caneças
 Canedo
 Canelas
 Caniçal
 Capelas
 Caramulo
 Caranguejeira
 Carapinheira
 Caria
 Carnaxide
 Carrazeda de Ansiães
 Carregado
 Carregal do Sal
 Carregosa
 Carrezedo de Montenegro
 Carvalhos
 Carvoeiro
 Cascais
 Castanheira de Pêra
 Castanheira do Ribatejo
 Castelo da Maia, Maia
 Castelo de Paiva
 Castelo de Vide
 Castro Daire
 Castro Marim
 Castro Verde
 Cavês
 Caxarias, Ourem
 Caxias, Oeiras
 Cedovim
 Ceira, Coimbra
 Cela
 Celorico da Beira
 Celorico de Basto
 Cercal do Alentejo
 Cernache do Bonjardim
 Cesar
 Chamusca
 Charneca da Caparica
 Cinfães
 Colares
 Condeixa-a-Nova
 Constância
 Corroios
 Cortegaça, Ovar
 Coruche
 Corvo, Azores
 Couço
 Crato
 Crestuma
 Cuba, Alentejo
 Cumieira

D
 Darque

E
 Eixo
 Ermidas do Sado
 Ervedosa do Douro
 Escoural
 Espinhal
 Estômbar
 Estreito de Câmara de Lobos, Madeira

F
 Fajões
 Famões
 Fânzeres
 Fão
 Favaios
 Fazendas de Almeirim
 Febres
 Fermentelos
 Fermil de Basto
 Ferragudo
 Ferreira do Alentejo
 Ferreira do Zêzere
 Ferro
 Figueira de Castelo Rodrigo
 Figueiró dos Vinhos
 Fontelo
 Fontes
 Forjães
 Fornos de Algodres
 Forte da Casa
 Foz do Arelho
 Frazão
 Freixianda
 Freixo de Espada à Cinta
 Freixo de Numão
 Fronteira
 Fuseta

G
 Gaeiras
 Gandarela de Basto
 Gavião
 Glória do Ribatejo
 Góis
 Golegã
 Gonçalo, Amarante
 Grândola
 Grijó

I
 Idanha-a-Nova
 Izeda

J
 Joane
 Juncal

L
 Lagares da Beira
 Lagoa, Azores (São Miguel Island)
 Lajeosa do Dão
 Lajes, Praia da Vitoria, Terceira island, Azores
 Lajes das Flores
 Lajes do Pico, Pico, Azores
 Lalim
 Lamas, Feira
 Lavradio
 Lazarim
 Leça da Palmeira
 Leça do Balio
 Leomil
 Lever, Gaia
 Linda-a-Velha, (Oeiras)
 Lobão, (Feira)
  (Guimarães)
  (Vila Real)
 Loriga, Seia
 Lorvão, Penacova
 Loureiro
 Louriçal
 Lourinhã
 Lousã
 Lousada
 Luso, Mealhada
 Luz (or Luz de Lagos), Algarve
 Luz de Tavira, Tavira, Algarve

M
 Mação
 Maceda
 Maceira
 Macieira de Cambra
 Madalena (Madeira)
 Mafra
 Maiorca
 Malveira
 Manschestertown Green
 Manteigas
 Marialva
 Marinhais
 Marmeleira
 Marvão
 Melgaço
 Mértola
 Mesão Frio
 Mexilhoeira Grande
 Minde
 Mira
 Mira de Aire
 Miranda do Corvo
 Mões
 Mogadouro
 Moimenta da Beira
 Moita
 Moita dos Ferreiros
 Monção
 Moncarapacho
 Monchique
 Mondim da Beira
 Mondim de Basto
 Monforte
 Monsanto
 Montalegre
 Monte da Caparica
 Monte Gordo
 Monte Real
 Montemor-o-Velho
 Mora
 Moreira, Maia
 Moreira de Cónegos
 Mortágua
 Moscavide
 Mourão
 Mourisca
 Mozelos
 Murça
 Murtosa

N
 Nazaré
 Nelas
 Nespereira
 Nisa
 Nogueira da Regedoura
 Nogueira do Cravo
 Nordeste, Azores

O
 Óbidos
 Odeceixe
 Odemira
 Oeiras
 Oiã
 Oleiros
 Olival
 Olival Basto
 Oliveira de Frades
 Oliveirinha
 Ourique

P
 Paço de Arcos, Oeiras
 Paço de Sousa
 Paços de Brandão
 Paião
 Palmela
 Pampilhosa
 Pampilhosa da Serra
 Paranhos da Beira
 Parchal
 Parede, Cascais
 Paredes de Coura
 Pataias
 Pedrario
 Pedras Salgadas
 Pedrógão Grande
 Pedroso
 Penacova
 Penalva do Castelo
 Penamacor
 Penedono
 Penela
 Pêra
 Pereira (formerly Pereira do Campo), Montemor-o-Velho
 Pêro Pinheiro, Sintra
 Perosinho
 Pevidém
 Pias
 Pinhal Novo
 Pinhão
 Pinheiro da Bemposta
 Ponta do Sol
 Ponte
 Ponte da Barca
 Ponte de Lima
 Pontével
 Pontinha
 Porches
 Portel
 Porto da Cruz
 Porto de Mós
 Porto Moniz (Madeira)
 Porto Salvo
 Póvoa de Lanhoso
 Póvoa de Santo Adrião
 Povoação (Azores)
 Prados
 Praia de Mira (Mira)
 Praia do Carvoeiro (Algarve)
 Proença-a-Nova

Q
 Queijas
 Quinta do Conde
 Quinta Do Lago

R
 Ramada
 Rebordões
 Redondo
 Resende
 Riachos
 Riba de Ave
 Ribamar
 Ribeira Brava
 Ribeira de Pena
 Ribeirão
 Rio de Moinhos
 Rio de Mouro
 Rio Meão
 Ronfe
 Rossas

S
 Sabrosa
 Sagres
 Salir
 Salto
 Salvaterra de Magos
 Salzedas
 Sandim
 Sanfins do Douro
 Sangalhos, Anadia
 Santa Catarina 
 Santa Catarina da Serra
 Santa Cruz da Graciosa [Azores]
 Santa Cruz da Trapa
 Santa Cruz das Flores [Azores]
 
 Santa Luzia
 Santa Marinha, (Seia)
 Santa Marinha do Zêzere
 Santa Marta de Penaguião
 Santar
 Santo André (Barreiro)
 Santo António dos Cavaleiros
 São Bartolomeu de Messines, Silves
 São Brás de Alportel
 São Cosmado
 São Félix da Marinha, Gaia
 São João da Pesqueira
 São João de Areias
 São João de Ovar, Ovar
 São João de Tarouca, Tarouca
 São João de Ver
 São João do Campo
 São João do Monte
 São Manços
 São Martinho de Anta, Alijo
 São Martinho de Mouros
 São Martinho do Campo (Campo),[Valongo]
 São Martinho do Porto
 São Miguel de Machede
 São Paio de Oleiros
 São Pedro da Cova
 São Pedro de Alva
 São Pedro de Castelões
 São Pedro de Rates
 São Pedro do Sul
 São Romão (Seia municipality)
 São Roque, Pico island, Azores
 São Teotónio
 São Tomé de Negrelos
 São Torcato
 São Vicente, Madeira island
 São Vicente de Alfena  or Alfena(Valongo)
 Sardoal
 Sátão
 Seixo da Beira
 Sendim
 Sendim
 Senhora da Hora
 Sernancelhe
 Serra d'El-Rei
 Sertã
 Serzedelo
 Serzedo
 Sesimbra
 Sever do Vouga
 Silgueiros
 Silvares
 Sintra
 Soalheira
 Sobrado
 Sobral de Monte Agraço
 Sobralinho
 Sobreda
 Soure
 Sousel
 Souselas
 Souselo
 Souto, Abrantes
 Souto, Sabugal

T
 Tábua
 Tabuaço
 Teixoso
 Tentúgal
 Termas do Gerês
 Terras do Bouro
 Tocha
 Torrão
 Torre de Dona Chama
 Torre de Moncorvo
 Torredeita
 Torreira
 Tortosendo
 Trafaria, Almada
 Tramagal
 Treixedo
 Trevões
 Turcifal
 Turquel

U
 Unhais da Serra

V
 Vagos
 Valadares
 Valado dos Frades
 Vale de Santarém
 Válega
 Vale Do Lobo
 Valença
 Velas
 Verride
 Vialonga
 Viana do Alentejo
 Vidago
 Vidigueira
 Vieira de Leiria
 Vieira do Minho
 Vila Chã de Ourique
 Vila Chã de São Roque
 Vila Cova à Coelheira
 Vila da Calheta
 Vila das Aves
 Vila de Cucujães
 Vila de Prado
 Vila de Rei
 Vila do Bispo
 Vila do Coronado
 Vila do Porto, Santa Maria Island, Azores
 Vila Flor
 Vila Franca das Naves, Trancoso (Beiras
 Vila Franca do Campo
 Vila Meã, Amarante
 Vila Nova da Barquinha
 Vila Nova da Rainha
 Vila Nova de Cacela
 Vila Nova de Cerveira
 Vila Nova de Milfontes
 Vila Nova de Oliveirinha
 Vila Nova de Paiva
 Vila Nova de Poiares
 Vila Nova de São Bento
 Vila Nova de Tazem (Gouveia)
 Vila Pouca de Aguiar
 Vila Praia de Âncora or Ancora, Caminha
 Vila Velha de Ródão
 Vila Verde
 Vila Viçosa
 Vilar de Maçada
 Vilar Formoso
 Vilarandelo
 Vimioso
 Vinhais
 Vouzela

Z
 Zebreira

References

See also
 Districts of Portugal
 List of cities in Portugal
 List of municipalities of Portugal
 Freguesias of Portugal
 List of Roman cities in Lusitania(Portugal)

 
Portugal, Towns in
Towns
06